Rohit Sharma (born 1968) is an Indian cricketer who played for Uttar Pradesh.

References

1968 births
Living people
Indian cricketers
Place of birth missing (living people)